Christmas Could Have Been Good is a song by Swedish rock band Mando Diao which was released digitally on December 2, 2011 along with a video . In January 2012, the song was added as the only previously unreleased song to the compilation album Greatest Hits Volume 1.

References 

2011 singles
Mando Diao songs
2011 songs